James Oswald may refer to:

James Oswald (elder) (1650–1716), of Dunniker, Scottish politician, MP for Dysart Burgh, 1710–15
James Oswald (philosopher) (1703–1793), Scottish theological writer of the "common sense" school
James Oswald (composer) (1710–1769), Scottish composer, arranger, cellist, and music publisher
James Oswald (younger) (1715–1769), of Dunnikier, Scottish Whig politician and Privy Counsellor
James Townsend Oswald (1748–1814), of Dunnikier, Scottish politician
James Oswald (merchant) (died 1853), of Shieldhall, Scottish merchant and MP for Glasgow
James Francis Oswald (1838–1908), British politician, Member of Parliament for Oldham
Jimmy Oswald (1868–1948), Scottish footballer
James Oswald (writer), Scottish writer
James Oswald (moderator) (1703–1793), Moderator of the General Assembly of the Church of Scotland in 1765